Enguerrand de Marigny, Baron Le Portier (126030 April 1315) was a French chamberlain and minister of Philip IV.

Early life
He was born at Lyons-la-Forêt in Normandy, of an old Norman family of the lesser baronage called Le Portier, which took the name of Marigny about 1200.

Enguerrand entered the service of Hugues II de Bouville, chamberlain and secretary of king Philip IV, as a squire, and then was attached to the household of Queen Jeanne, who made him one of the executors of her will. He married her god-daughter, Jeanne de St Martin. In 1298 he received the custody of the castle of Issoudun.

Ministry
After the death of Pierre Flotte at Courtrai in 1302 and de Bouville at the Battle of Mons-en-Pévèle in 1304, he became Philip's Grand Chamberlain and chief minister. In 1306 he was sent to preside over the exchequer of Normandy. He received numerous gifts of land and money from Philip as well as a pension from Edward II of England.
Possessed of an ingratiating manner, politic, learned and astute, he acted as an able instrument in carrying out Philip's plans, and received corresponding confidence. He shared the popular odium which Philip incurred by debasing the coinage. He acted as the agent of Philip in his contest with Louis, Count of Nevers, the son of Robert III of Flanders, imprisoning Louis and forcing Robert to surrender Lille, Douai and Béthune.

He obtained for his half-brother Philip de Marigny in 1301 the bishopric of Cambrai, and in 1309 the archbishopric of Sens, and for his brother Jean in 1312 the bishopric of Beauvais. Still another relative, Nicolas de Frauville, became the king's confessor and a cardinal. He addressed the Estates-General in 1314 and succeeded in getting further taxes for the Flemish war, incurring at the same time much ill will.
This soon came to a head when the princes of the blood, eager to fight the Flemings, were disappointed by his negotiating a peace in September. He was accused of receiving bribes, and Charles of Valois denounced him to the king himself; but Philip stood by him and the attack was of no avail. The death of Philip IV on 29 November 1314 was a signal for a reaction against his policy. The feudal party, whose power the king had tried to limit, turned on his ministers and chiefly on his chamberlain.

Downfall
Enguerrand was arrested by Louis X at the instigation of Charles of Valois, and twenty-eight articles of accusation including charges of receiving bribes were brought against him. He was refused a hearing; but his accounts were correct, and Louis was inclined to spare him anything more than banishment to the island of Cyprus. Charles then brought forward a charge of sorcery which was more effectual. He was condemned at once and hanged on the public gibbet of Montfaucon, protesting that in all his acts he had only been carrying out Philip's commands (30 April 1315).

Marigny founded the collegiate church of Notre-Dame d'Écouis near Rouen in 1313. He was twice married, first to Jeanne de St Martin, by whom he had three children, Louis, Marie and Isabelle (who married Robert, son of Robert de Tancarville); and the second time to Alips de Mons.

In fiction
Marigny is a major character in Les Rois maudits (The Accursed Kings), a series of historical novels by Maurice Druon, which were adapted into a television miniseries in 1972 and again in 2005. He was portrayed by André Falcon in 1972 and by Jean-Claude Drouot in 2005.

Marigny is also referenced in the final chapter of The Hunchback of Notre-Dame as the first victim of Montfaucon, and a just man.

References

 Contemporary chroniclers in vols. xx. to xxiii. of D Bouquet, Historiens de la France
 Pierre Clément, Trois drames historiques (Paris, 1857)
 Charles Dufayard, La Réaction féodale sous les fils de Philippe le Bel, in the Revue historique (1894, liv. 241272).

1260 births
1315 deaths
13th-century French people
14th-century French people
Executed people from Normandy
People executed by France by hanging
People executed by the Ancien Régime in France
People from Eure
Philip IV of France
14th-century executions by France
French people executed for witchcraft
Witch trials in France